Phyllomedusa coelestis is a species of frog in the subfamily Phyllomedusinae. It is found in Colombia, Ecuador, and Peru. Its natural habitats are subtropical or tropical moist lowland forests and rivers, but is threatened by habitat loss.

References

Phyllomedusa
Amphibians of Colombia
Amphibians of Ecuador
Amphibians of Peru
Amphibians described in 1874
Taxonomy articles created by Polbot